CKRZ-FM is a radio station in Ohsweken, Ontario. Owned by the Southern Onkwehon:we Nishinabec Indigenous Communications Society (SONICS), the station airs a community radio format for the region's Six Nations and Mississauga First Nations.

History
The station started broadcasting in 1987. Its frequency is 100.3 FM and is available on Rogers cable, channel 951 in Brantford, Kitchener, Woodstock and London.

CKRZ's broadcasts are multilingual, broadcasting in Cayuga, Mohawk, and other languages. On Sundays, CKRZ still hosts a radio bingo with jackpots of up to $16,000.

Financial crisis
On January 29, 2009, the station announced that due to a rising debt load of more than $100,000 and reduced advertising revenue, it would leave the air on February 1, 2009. At an emergency meeting of SONICS' board and membership, the members subsequently voted to continue the station, as they considered it an asset to the community.

Walt Juchniewicz, a broadcast engineer from Hamilton who had worked with the station in the past, offered to donate services and equipment to help upgrade the station's studios. Juchniewicz called Six Nations one of the nicest communities he had ever worked in, adding that "there are a lot of good people at that station and it's got a better chance of recovering than some of the bigger broadcasters that are in trouble now, too."

The station resumed broadcasting on February 12. It was temporarily reduced to automated programming, with a single live personality to read news reports and community announcements, in order to give SONICS time to eliminate the station's accumulated debt.

References

External links 
 CKRZ-FM
 
Broadcasting Decision CRTC 2016-449
 

Krz
Krz
Radio stations established in 1987
1987 establishments in Ontario
Mississaugas